The Turkish Men's Volleyball Cup is a national cup competition for professional men's volleyball teams in Turkey, organised by the Turkish Volleyball Federation since the 1988–89 season. Between 2003 and 2007, the tournament was not held for four consecutive seasons.

Most successful team of the competition are Halkbank with seven titles. Current champions are Arkas, who won their 3rd title by defeating rivals Galatasaray 3–2 in the 2022 final.

Champions

Source:

Performance by club

See also
 Men's
Turkish Men's Volleyball League
Turkish Men's Volleyball Cup
Turkish Men's Volleyball Super Cup
 Women's
Turkish Women's Volleyball League
Turkish Women's Volleyball Cup
Turkish Women's Volleyball Super Cup

References

External links
Turkish Volleyball Federastion

Men's Cup
Cup
Recurring sporting events established in 1988
1988 establishments in Turkey